A luta continua (in English: the struggle continues) was the rallying cry of the FRELIMO movement during Mozambique's war for independence. The phrase is in the Portuguese language (the official language of the former Portuguese colony) a slogan coined by the first president of FRELIMO, Dr. Eduardo Chivambo Mondlane, which he used to rally the population in the liberated zones of Mozambique during the armed struggle against Portuguese colonial rule. Following his assassination in 1969, his successor, Samora Machel, continued to use the slogan to cultivate popular support during post-independence to mobilize the population for a new Mozambique which Mondlane defined as "We fight together, and together we rebuild and we recreate our country, producing a new reality - a New Mozambique, United and Freed. The struggle continues!"

Machel became the first president of an independent Mozambique in 1975 and continued to use the phrase a luta continua as an unofficial national motto. Posters bearing the phrase can still be found on the walls of Maputo, the nation's capital.

Use by activist movements

The phrase appeared on T-shirts worn by LGBT rights activists at the funeral of David Kato in Uganda in 2011. It has also been adopted by Uganda opposition leader Bobi Wine.

A luta continua is also widely used in Nigeria by students and activists. Protests, riots, and other actions to demand for the rights of Nigerian students are termed as "Aluta". It is the motto of the all-Nigerian Students Union across all academic institutions of higher education. It is generally given in full: "A luta continua; vitória é certa", meaning "The struggle continues; victory is certain".

Increased usage of the term has also been noted during the 2016 South African Fees Must Fall protests.

Internationally, the phrase has also been used by human rights activists in Indonesia who demanded action from government for unresolved cases of human rights violation. The phrase gained traction especially after the 2019 Indonesian protests and riots.

Use in popular media
The phrase has been used as the title of a 1971 film on the struggle for Mozambican independence. It is also the title of a Mozambique-inspired song popularized by South African singer Miriam Makeba and written for her by her daughter Bongi after she attended the independence ceremony of Mozambique in 1975 and then released on the album Welela in 1989.

In addition, the phrase appears at the end of the credits to four films by American director Jonathan Demme:
 Philadelphia (1993)
 The Silence of the Lambs (1991)
 Married to the Mob (1988)
 Something Wild (1986)

A man can be seen holding a sign with 'A Luta Continua' on the Reading Central Club's black culture mural in Reading, Berkshire.

References

External links
 The African Activist Archive Project website includes the 1972 movie A Luta Continua about the liberation struggle in Mozambique against Portuguese colonial rule led by the liberation organization FRELIMO.

Mozambican War of Independence
Political catchphrases
Political quotes
Politics of Mozambique
South African political slogans